The Mulberry Street Bridge is a concrete arch bridge that spans Cameron Street and Paxton Creek in Harrisburg, Pennsylvania. The bridge is the second constructed at the current site to connect the Allison Hill neighborhood of East Harrisburg to Downtown. It replaced an iron and fire-prone, wood-decked structure erected in 1891, which was heralded as a unifier of a "Greater Harrisburg". The concrete replacement bridge constructed in 1909, was a marvel at the time, and is eligible to be listed on the National Register of Historic Places.

See also
List of bridges documented by the Historic American Engineering Record in Pennsylvania

References

External links

Arch bridges in the United States
Bridges completed in 1909
Bridges in Harrisburg, Pennsylvania
Concrete bridges in the United States
Historic American Engineering Record in Pennsylvania
Road bridges in Pennsylvania